All-American Co-ed is a 1941 American musical film produced and directed by Leroy Prinz as a Hal Roach Streamliner for release by United Artists. It stars Frances Langford, Johnny Downs, Marjorie Woodworth, Noah Beery Jr., Esther Dale, Harry Langdon, and The Tanner Sisters.

Plot
Quinceton College Zeta fraternity stages a revue with members in drag. The resulting publicity catches the attention of newspaperman Hap Holden (Harry Langdon) and Virginia Collinge (Frances Langford). They convince Virginia's aunt Matilda Collinge (Esther Dale), president of failing Mar Brynn (a woman's horticultural  college), to refute the school's staid image by sponsoring a contest awarding a dozen free scholarships aimed at "unusual girls", winners of pageants for fruits, vegetables and flowers, as women most likely to succeed and to be showcased in a musical presentation during the Fall Festival.

To publicize the contest, President Collinge pokes fun at Zeta members as being least likely to succeed and bans them from their campus. For revenge the Zeta chapter president Bob Sheppard (Johnny Downs) is coerced to infiltrate Mar Brynn by entering the contest as "Bobbie DeWolfe, Queen of the Flowers". After falling in love with Virginia, Bob comes clean and assists in staging the show, but includes in the finale a Busby Berkeley-style spelling out of "Zeta" as revenge for the ban.

Cast
 Frances Langford as Virginia
 Johnny Downs as Bob Sheppard
 Marjorie Woodworth as Bunny
 Noah Beery Jr. as Slinky
 Esther Dale as Matilda
 Harry Langdon as Hap Holden
 Alan Hale Jr. as Tiny
 Kent Rogers as Henry
 Allan Lane as 2nd Senior
 Joe Brown Jr. as 3rd Senior
 Irving Mitchell as Doctor
 Lillian Randolph as Washwoman (Deborah)
 Carlyle Blackwell Jr. as 4th Senior
 Mickey TannerBetty TannerMartha Tanner as Vocal Trio

Uncredited
 Frank O'Connor, as Policeman
 Jesse Graves, as Redcap
 Dudley Dickerson, as Dancing Train Porter
 Elyse Knox, as Co-ed
 Marie Windsor, as Carrot Queen

Soundtrack 
 Johnny Downs with chorus - "I'm a Chap with a Chip on My Shoulder" (by Walter G. Samuels and Charles Newman)
 Frances Langford - "I'm a Chap with a Chip on My Shoulder"
 Marjorie Woodworth, Tanner Sisters with Harry Langdon and chorus - "Up at the Crack of Dawn" (by Walter G. Samuels and Charles Newman)
 Frances Langford with chorus - "Out of the Silence" (by Lloyd B. Norlin)
 Frances Langford, Tanner Sisters and Johnny Downs - "The Farmer's Daughter" (by Walter G. Samuels and Charles Newman)

"Out of the Silence", music and lyrics by Lloyd B. Norlin, was nominated for the Academy Award for Best Original Song of 1941. It lost to Jerome Kern and Oscar Hammerstein's "The Last Time I Saw Paris", from Lady Be Good (1941).

External links
 
 
 

1940s American films
1940s English-language films
1941 films
1941 musical comedy films
American black-and-white films
American musical comedy films
Films about fraternities and sororities
Films scored by Edward Ward (composer)
Films set in universities and colleges
Films directed by LeRoy Prinz
United Artists films